Kfar Shaul Mental Health Center, established in 1951, is an Israeli public psychiatric hospital located between Givat Shaul and Har Nof, Jerusalem. It is affiliated with the Hadassah Medical Center and the Hebrew University of Jerusalem. The hospital is Jerusalem's designated  psychiatric hospital for tourists who display mental health disturbances, and is widely known for its research on Jerusalem Syndrome.

The hospital is located on the grounds of the former Palestinian village of Deir Yassin, and makes use of buildings that remained intact after the massacre of Deir Yassin that occurred during the 1948 Palestine War.

History

The Givat Shaul mental health center opened in 1951, utilizing the houses and school building of Deir Yassin, which had been left untouched. It was originally a  therapeutic community of 300 patients who spent most of the day working outdoors. It was called the Kfar Shaul Government Work Village for Mental Patients. In its early years, the majority of the patients were Holocaust survivors. The hospital now suffers from severe overcrowding and has an average occupancy rate of 110 percent. Udi Aloni, an Israeli director who made a film about the hospital, Forgiveness (2006), described it as dilapidated.

Snoezelen rooms
The hospital is equipped with Snoezelen rooms, a Dutch therapy technique which uses controlled stimulation of the five senses to benefit the mentally and physically disabled.

Jerusalem Syndrome
The hospital is known in particular for its association with Jerusalem Syndrome, a condition in which the sufferer is gripped by religious delusions. The hospital sees some 50 patients a year who are diagnosed with the condition. Israel psychologist Gregory Katz has said many of the patients are Pentecostals from rural parts of the United States and Scandinavia. The syndrome was first diagnosed in 1993 by Yair Bar-El, a former director of the hospital.

Archaeology
In 2000, archaeologists unearthed the remains of a winepress dated to the Byzantine or Roman era on the grounds of the hospital.

Published research
Bar-El, I. et al. "Psychiatric hospitalization of tourists in Jerusalem", Compr Psychiatry. 1991 May-Jun;32(3):238-44.
Durst, R. et al. "Amnesiac state in a Holocaust survivor patient: Psychogenic versus neurological basis", Isr J Psychiatry Relat Sci. 1999;36(1):47-54.
Durst, R. et al. "Kleptomania: diagnosis and treatment options", CNS Drugs. 2001;15(3):185-95.
Katz, G. et al. "Time zone change and major psychiatric morbidity: The results of a 6-year study in Jerusalem", Compr Psychiatry. 2002 Jan-Feb;43(1):37-40.
Raskin, Sergey. "The concept of judgment in the medico-legal context: A view from Israel", Journal of Psychiatric Intensive Care (2009), 5: 41–46.
Zislin, Josef et al. "Male Genital Self-Mutilation in the Context of Religious Belief: The Jerusalem Syndrome", Transcultural Psychiatry, June 2002.

See also
Health in Israel

References

Hospital buildings completed in 1951
Psychiatric hospitals in Israel
Hospitals in Jerusalem